William Jephson may refer to:
 Sir William Jephson (died 1615), MP for Hampshire
 William Jephson (died 1658), MP for Stockbridge and Cork
 William Jephson (died 1691), MP for East Grinstead and Wycombe
 William Jephson (died 1698), MP for Mallow
 William Jephson (died 1716), MP for Mallow
 William Jephson (died 1779), MP for Mallow
 William Jephson (priest) (died 1720), dean of Lismore
 William Jephson (cricketer) (1873–1956), English cricketer